WSML is located in Graham, North Carolina, and broadcasts at 1200 AM. The station airs a country music format branded as Maverick 95.1-94.3.

History
WSML signed on December 2, 1967, as a daytimer operating at 1190 AM, owned by Smiles of Graham, Inc. In its early years, the station had a top 40 format, but by 1970 it had become a country music station. This gave way to a rock format by 1973, and a blend of country and rock soon thereafter. By 1975, WSML had integrated beautiful music into the format and cut back its country music programming; however, after a sale of the station to Acme Communications (no relation to the current television station owner) in 1976, it reverted to a full-time country format.

In 1981, the station was sold to Graycasting, Inc. and became WWOK; a year later, Evans Communications Corporation took over the station and reinstated the WSML call letters. By this time, the station had added religious programming to its country format; religion had become its full-time format by 1987, after having been acquired by Gray Broadcasting Company (unrelated to Gray Television) two years earlier. WSML moved to 1200 AM in 1991, allowing the station to begin 24-hour operation. By the 1990s, programming consisted of gospel music.

What had become Graycasting Media sold WSML to Clear Channel Communications in 1998. Clear Channel converted the station to a news/talk format, largely simulcasting sister station WSJS from Winston-Salem; this filled in a gap in WSJS' coverage of Greensboro and the eastern part of the Piedmont Triad (especially at night). There was some separate programming — predominantly NC State Wolfpack sports and Sunday morning programming.

After Clear Channel was forced to divest some of its stations in order to merge with AMFM Broadcasting, WSML and WSJS were sold in 2000 to Infinity Broadcasting Corporation, which also purchased WMFR from AMFM. CBS Radio (which Infinity became in 2005), in turn, sold the three stations to Curtis Media Group in 2007. Curtis dropped the WSJS simulcast from WSML on July 15, 2010, replacing it with sports radio programming.

Effective February 11, 2019, Curtis Media Group sold WSML and translators W232DT and W236BQ to Alamance Media Partners, Inc. for $397,500.

References

External links

 

SML
Radio stations established in 1967
Country radio stations in the United States
1967 establishments in North Carolina